Eket Airstrip or Eket Airfield  is an airport serving Eket, a city in the Akwa Ibom State of Nigeria.

The Eket non-directional beacon (Ident:EK) is located on the field. Runway length does not include a  displaced threshold on Runway 19.

See also
Transport in Nigeria
List of airports in Nigeria

References

External links
OurAirports - Eket
SkyVector Aeronautical Charts
OpenStreetMap - Eket

Airports in Nigeria
Akwa Ibom State